Legends Never Die is the second and final studio album by American hip hop recording artist Chinx. The album was released on September 16, 2016, by Entertainment One Music, Coke Boys Records, Riot Squad and NuSense Music Group.

Singles
On April 11, 2016, the album's lead single "For the Love" featuring Meet Sims was released. On May 17, 2016, the album's second single "Like This" featuring Chrisette Michele and Meet Sims was released.

Track listing

Charts

References

2016 albums
Albums published posthumously
Chinx albums